Tevita Nabura (born 2 June 1992) is a Fijian-born New Zealand rugby union player who plays for the  in the Super Rugby competition.  His position of choice is wing.
He is the former head boy and rugby captain of Ratu Kadavulevu  School.

References 

New Zealand rugby union players
1992 births
Living people
Fijian rugby union players
Rugby union wings
Counties Manukau rugby union players
Highlanders (rugby union) players